Eugen Einman (6 October 1905 – 12 September 1963) was an Estonian professional footballer who played as a right-back for the Estonian national team.

Career
He played for the Tiigiveski youth club. He debuted for the Estonian national team on September 14, 1924 and has scored five goals in sixty-four games internationally.

References

1905 births
1963 deaths
Footballers from Tallinn
People from the Governorate of Estonia
Estonian footballers
Estonia international footballers
Association football defenders
Footballers at the 1924 Summer Olympics
Olympic footballers of Estonia